Hugh Menzies  (4 September 1857 – 13 February 1925) was an Australian politician representing the electoral district of Stawell in the Victorian Legislative Assembly between 1902 and 1904 as a Ministerialist member. He served as Mayor of the Shire of Stawell from 1895 to 1896.

He was the older brother of James Menzies and uncle of Sir Robert Menzies, the 12th and longest serving Prime Minister of Australia.

Biography
Menzies was born in Ballarat, Victoria to emigrant parents Robert and Elizabeth of Scotland. Before entering state politics, Menzies was a publican and a bank manager, and a long-serving Councillor for the Shire of Stawell. He won the state seat of Stawell as a Ministerialist candidate which was subsequently abolished and replaced with the combined electoral district of Stawell and Ararat. He contested the redistributed seat in both 1904 and 1908, and both times lost to Richard Toutcher, the incumbent member for Ararat.

Menzies married Eleanor Lodge in 1885. He died on 13 February 1925, and was interred at Brighton Cemetery.

References

Victoria (Australia) state politicians
Australian people of Scottish descent
People from Ballarat
1857 births
1925 deaths
20th-century Australian politicians
Members of the Victorian Legislative Assembly
Mayors of places in Victoria (Australia)
Australian bankers